William George Hayden  (born 23 January 1933) is an Australian politician who served as the 21st governor-general of Australia from 1989 to 1996. He was Leader of the Labor Party and Leader of the Opposition from 1977 to 1983, and served as Minister for Foreign Affairs and Trade from 1983 to 1988 under Bob Hawke and as Treasurer of Australia in 1975 under Gough Whitlam.

Hayden was born in Brisbane, Queensland. He attended Brisbane State High School and then joined the Queensland Police, working as a police officer for eight years while studying economics part-time at the University of Queensland. Hayden was elected to the House of Representatives at the 1961 federal election, aged 28 – along with Manfred Cross and Doug McClelland, Hayden is the earliest elected Labor MP still alive. When Gough Whitlam led the Labor Party to victory in 1972, he was made Minister for Social Security. He replaced Jim Cairns as Treasurer in 1975, but served for only five months before the government was dismissed.

In early 1977, Hayden challenged Whitlam for the party leadership and was defeated by just two votes. He defeated Lionel Bowen to succeed Whitlam as Leader of the Opposition at the end of the year, following Labor's defeat at the 1977 election. Hayden led the party to the 1980 election, recording a substantial swing but falling well short of victory. He was replaced by Bob Hawke just a few weeks before the 1983 election, after months of speculation. Hayden served as Minister for Foreign Affairs and Trade from 1983 to 1988, then left parliament to assume the governor-generalship. He held that position for seven years, with only Lord Gowrie having served for longer.

Early life
Hayden was born on 23 January 1933 at the Lady Bowen Lying-In Hospital in Spring Hill, Queensland. He was the first child born to Violet Quinn and George Hayden, who married a few weeks after his birth. He had a younger brother and two younger sisters, as well as an older half-brother from his mother's first marriage who was raised by an aunt. His parents both had prior marriages which ended in widowhood.

Hayden's father was an American seaman, probably born in California, who jumped ship in Sydney a few years before World War I. He worked as a piano-tuner and musical instrument salesman, moving to Rockhampton, Queensland, in the early 1920s. He held radical political views and was a member of the Industrial Workers of the World. Hayden's mother was born in Brandon, Queensland, to a working-class family of Irish descent. After the death of her first husband, a shearer, she worked in Rockhampton as a barmaid. The couple moved to Brisbane during the Great Depression.

Hayden spent his first year at a boardinghouse in Fortitude Valley, before the family moved to a rented cottage in the working-class area of Highgate Hill. The family became more financially stable after his father enlisted in the army in 1941. He began his education at St Ita's Catholic Primary School in South Brisbane, but was withdrawn from the school when it rescinded his father's contract to tune the school pianos. He switched to Dutton Park State School and was later highly critical of the quality of education that he received. Hayden went on to South Brisbane Intermediate School, where he passed the state scholarship exam in 1947. This allowed him to complete his secondary education at Brisbane State High School in 1948 and 1949. After leaving school, he found work as a junior clerk in the State Government Stores, where he worked until joining the police. He was conscripted to the Royal Australian Navy for six months following the passage of the National Service Act 1951, having earlier unsuccessfully applied to join the Royal Australian Air Force as an 18-year-old.

Policing career
Hayden joined the Queensland Police Force in 1953 following his father's death. He completed his training in Brisbane and the following year was transferred to Mackay in North Queensland. He was briefly stationed in the small country towns of Calen and Sarina.  As he was supporting his mother and younger siblings, he also worked a second full-time job driving a milk truck and various seasonal jobs on rural properties. In 1956, Hayden was transferred back to Brisbane and worked as a plainclothes constable at the Criminal Investigation Branch (CIB). He was later moved to police headquarters on Roma Street where he was rostered on at Government House, guarding the governor of Queensland. He was transferred again in 1957 to the two-man police station at Redbank, on the outskirts of Ipswich.

Politics (1961–1988)

Hayden held far-left views as a young man and attempted to join the Communist Party of Australia, but was refused membership due to his police ties. He first attempted to join the ALP in South Brisbane in 1953, but was also regarded with suspicion in the context of the ALP split of the mid-1950s. He was ultimately recruited to the Redbank branch of the ALP in 1957. Hayden became "an active and energetic party worker, closely aligned with the left-wing Trades Hall faction that now controlled the Queensland ALP". He became secretary of the electoral executive committee for the state seat of Bremer and president of the divisional executive for the federal seat of Oxley. In 1960 he began attending adult matriculation classes with a view towards attending university. He also attended political science lectures given by Max Poulter at the Brisbane Trades Hall.

In October 1960, Hayden won ALP preselection for the federal seat of Oxley, running as the Trades Hall candidate against Australian Workers' Union (AWU) candidate Bert Warren. At the 1961 federal election he unexpectedly defeated incumbent Liberal MP and cabinet minister Donald Cameron, winning 53 percent of the primary vote on an 11-point swing. Hayden's win was part of a 15-seat swing to Labor that nearly brought down the Menzies government.

Overcoming initial resistance to his membership of the Labor party, Hayden was soon popularly elected as one of the then youngest members of the federal parliament (only 28 years old at the time he entered it). He proved to be a diligent, well-spoken parliamentarian. In 1969, he became a member of the Opposition front bench.

Whitlam Government (1972–1975)

When Labor won the 1972 election under Gough Whitlam, Hayden was appointed Minister for Social Security, and in that capacity, among other efforts to promoting reform, introduced the single mothers pension and Medibank, Australia's first system of universal health insurance. On 6 June 1975, he succeeded Jim Cairns as Treasurer, a position he held until the Whitlam government was dismissed by the Governor-General, Sir John Kerr, on 11 November 1975. Labor suffered its worst-ever defeat in the election held a month later, and Hayden was left as the only Labor MP from Queensland.

Opposition leader (1977–1983)
When Labor lost the 1977 election in another landslide, Whitlam retired as leader. In the ensuing leadership ballot Hayden was elected over Lionel Bowen to succeed him; Bowen was then elected as Hayden's deputy. Aged 44, he was the youngest person to be elected leader of the Labor Party since Chris Watson in 1901. His political views had become more moderate, and he advocated economic policies which encompassed the private sector and the American alliance.

At the 1980 election. Labor finished a mere 0.8 percent behind Fraser's government on the two-party vote, having gained a nationwide swing of over four percent. Yet, due to the geographically uneven nature of the swing (strong in Victoria and, to a lesser degree, Western Australia and New South Wales, but comparatively weak everywhere else), Labor fell 12 seats short of toppling the Coalition. Hayden did, however, regain much of what Labor had lost in the previous two elections. He also slashed Fraser's majority in half, from 23 seats to 11.

By 1982 it was evident that Fraser was manoeuvring to call an early election. But the main threat to Hayden came less from Fraser than from elements in Hayden's own party. Bob Hawke, a former union leader who had been elected to Parliament two years earlier, began mobilising his supporters to challenge Hayden's leadership. On 16 July 1982 Hayden narrowly defeated a challenge by Hawke in a party ballot but Hawke continued to plot against Hayden.

In December Labor surprised many pundits by its failure to win the vital Flinders by-election in Victoria, further raising doubts about Hayden's ability to lead the ALP to power. On 3 February 1983, in a meeting in Brisbane, various leading Labor figures, including Paul Keating and Senator John Button, told Hayden that he must resign. He reluctantly accepted their advice. Hawke was then elected leader on 8 February, unopposed.

Fraser had been well aware of the infighting within Labor and wanted to call an election before the party could replace Hayden with Hawke. On the same morning that Hayden resigned—and unaware that Hayden had resigned—Fraser asked for, and was granted, an election for 5 March. Fraser only learned of Hayden's resignation a few hours before the election writs were issued. At a press conference that afternoon Hayden, still chagrined, said that "a drover's dog could lead the Labor Party to victory, the way the country is". Hayden's quip about a "drover's dog" became part of Australian political history. Hayden himself referred to it good-humouredly many years when he said, "There are so many things I did in my political life that I am very proud of. ...  But the one thing I am remembered for is damn well saying 'A drover's dog could win the next election'. It seems to have settled into political idiom. The only person who didn't like it was Bob Hawke."

Foreign Minister (1983–1988)
Labor won the 1983 election handily, and Hayden became Minister for Foreign Affairs and Trade. In that post, he advocated closer integration between Australia and its Asian neighbours. In a 1983 interview, he stated: "Australia is changing. We're an anomaly as a European country in this part of the world. There's already a large and growing Asian population in Australia and it is inevitable in my view that Australia will become a Eurasian country over the next century or two. Australian Asians and Europeans will marry another and a new race will emerge: I happen to think that's desirable."

As Foreign Minister Hayden had oversight of the Australian foreign aid program. He pursued efforts to engage Vietnam and Cambodia despite vehement opposition from allied nations and key stakeholders. In 1983 Hayden announced a review of the Australian foreign aid program (known as the "Jackson Review" after the chair, Sir Gordon Jackson) which reported in March 1984. The main recommendations of the report, which were directed at improving the professional quality of the Australian aid program, were accepted by the Government. During the next few years, in various speeches Hayden set out the foreign aid priorities of the government.

Governor-General (1989–1996)
After winning the 1987 election, Prime Minister Hawke announced that Queen Elizabeth II, Queen of Australia had approved of Hayden’s appointment as Governor-General of Australia as a consolation for replacing him earlier as Labor Leader in 1983 and thus denying him the chance to become Prime Minister. The Queen's appointment of Hayden as Governor-General to succeed Sir Ninian Stephen was announced in mid-1988. In the following months, Hayden resigned from Parliament and severed his political connections with the Labor Party. He took up the post of Governor-General in early 1989 and served during the period of transition from the Hawke Government to the Keating Government in December 1991. The usual term of for a Governor-General was five years but, by agreement between the government and Hayden, his term was extended for an additional two years to early 1996.

Upon his appointment as Governor-General, he became, ex officio, Chancellor and Principal Companion of the Order of Australia.

The Governor-General is normally the Chief Scout of Australia. Hayden declined the office, because he identified as an atheist, which was incompatible with the Scout Promise. Instead, he served as the "National Patron" of the Scout Association during his time in office.

Later life

By the late 1990s Hayden joined the board of Quadrant. In the debate preceding the 1999 republic referendum, he rejected the specific proposal and sided with the monarchists, stating he supported the direct election of a president.

Since retirement from the position of Governor-General, Hayden has continued to contribute to public policy discussion in Australia. While on the board of Quadrant, he took time to lend personal support to the publication and wrote a tribute to its editor P.P. McGuinness on his death in 2008. He has also continued to write opinion and comment pieces for other magazines and newspapers in Australia about current social, economic and political issues including foreign affairs.

Personal life
In May 1960, Hayden married Dallas Broadfoot, the daughter of a miner from Ipswich. They initially lived in a rented cottage in Dinmore before building a house in Ipswich's western suburbs. The couple had three daughters and a son. Their oldest daughter Michaela died in 1966 at the age of five after being struck by a car.

In September 2018, Hayden was baptised as a Roman Catholic at St Mary's Church, Ipswich. He told The Catholic Leader that  "there’s been a gnawing pain in my heart and soul about what is the meaning of life". The baptismal ceremony was attended by a gathering of family, friends, and former colleagues.  Hayden's siblings, Patricia Oxenham, John Hayden, and Joan Moseman, along with other members of family, were present for the event.

Honours
By virtue of being Governor-General, Hayden was the Chancellor of the Order of Australia and its Principal Companion (AC). In 1999, Latvia awarded him the Order of the Three Stars 3rd Class.

He received an Honorary Doctorate of Laws from the University of Queensland in 1990 for his distinguished contributions to Australian life. Other awards included admission to the Order of St John Australia and also the Gwanghwa Medal of the Korean Order of Diplomatic Merit.

In 1996 he was recognised as the Australian Humanist of the Year by the Council of Australian Humanist Societies. In 2007 at the 45th State Conference of the Queensland Branch of the Australian Labor Party, Hayden was made a Life Member of the party.

In September 2017, in delivering the second Hayden Oration at the University of Southern Queensland in Ipswich, former Australian prime minister Paul Keating spoke at length of Hayden's contribution to the Labor Party. Keating spoke, in particular, of the reform period during the Hawke Labor Government in the 1980s in Australia. He noted that the foundations for the reforms had been set down before the Labor Party won office in 1983 during the period when Hayden was Leader of the Opposition and was working to prepare the Party for government. "Those great reforms", Keating said, "began with the frameworks Bill Hayden brought to the front bench, the day he became Leader of the Labor Party."

Hayden oration

A series of Hayden orations, sponsored by the University of Southern Queensland has been established to honour Bill Hayden. Lectures held in the series include the following:

 2016  First Oration, David Hamill, 14 August.
 2017  Second Oration, Paul Keating, 29 September. 
 2018  Third Oration, Neal Blewett, 15 August.

References

Further reading

 
 
 

1933 births
Living people
1975 Australian constitutional crisis
People educated at Brisbane State High School
Australian Roman Catholics
Converts to Roman Catholicism from atheism or agnosticism
Australian people of American descent
Australian people of Irish descent
Australian Labor Party members of the Parliament of Australia
Australian Leaders of the Opposition
Australian ministers for Foreign Affairs
Australian police officers
Companions of the Order of Australia
Former atheists and agnostics
Government ministers of Australia
Governors-General of Australia
Members of the Australian House of Representatives for Oxley
Members of the Australian House of Representatives
Members of the Cabinet of Australia
People from Brisbane
Treasurers of Australia
University of Queensland alumni
Delegates to the Australian Constitutional Convention 1998
20th-century Australian politicians
Leaders of the Australian Labor Party
Military personnel from Brisbane
Royal Australian Navy personnel